The Kitakyushu Film Commission (北九州フィルム・コミッション, KFC) is an organisation aiming to promote locations in the city of Kitakyushu for movies, television dramas, travel programs, commercials etc. and to support film makers when they come to the city to shoot on location.

It was founded on September 27, 2000 by the City of Kitakyushu.

The KFC is one of the top organisations of its kind in Japan.

Movies which have used Kitakyushu locations include Spy Sorge.

External links
Kitakyushu Film Commission - English home page
Location albums - photos of places in Kitakyushu

Kitakyushu
Film commissions
2000 establishments in Japan
Organizations established in 2000
Film organizations in Japan